Philotoceraeus descarpentriesi is a species of beetle in the family Cerambycidae. It was described by Breuning in 1975.

References

Agapanthiini
Beetles described in 1975